Gabriela Storace Alves (born 1 January 1972 in Rio de Janeiro) is a Brazilian actress.

Biography 

At age five, Alves played an angel with a broken wing broken in Sítio do Picapau Amarelo. But not to be labeled only as the daughter of Tânia Alves (her father, Juan Toulier, was a Peruvian painter and died in 2006) between 15 and 20 she thought it best to stop that life as an artist because the work was harming her studies. At the time needed braces, and now definitely be forgotten by the directors. Once she completed the course of teaching, she decided to go to the United States to study theater in New York City. To support herself, she worked as a seller of ice cream.

When she returned to Brazil, she worked in public relations and as an event organizer to regain contacts. She was one of the first hostesses to operate in Brazil. She liked to wear clothes of the 1960s to draw customers' attention. From there, her artistic life took off.

Career 

She acted in several novels, such as Despedida de Solteiro (1992), Mulheres de Areia (1993), Tropicaliente (1994), Salsa e Merengue (1996), beyond the show O Pagador de Promessas (1988), among others. Among her television work, which gave her more projection was Mulheres de Areia. At age 22, it asked if I really wanted to be an actress when she was invited to participate in the novel.

She discovered the next singer and music projects developed, in which they allowed her voice. She took the stage with the project "Caetaneando", performing with other players, songs of composer Baiano. Then, stripped of prejudice and was doing the Mexican soap opera Marisol in SBT, where she played a singer.

She returned in 2011 and participated in the television soap opera Amor e Revolução exhibited by SBT.

Filmography

Television

Film 
1987 - Sonhos de Menina-Moça ... Eva
1994 - Era uma Vez... ... Princess Luar

References

External links 

1972 births
Living people
Actresses from Rio de Janeiro (city)
Brazilian television actresses
Brazilian telenovela actresses
Brazilian film actresses
Brazilian stage actresses
20th-century Brazilian actresses
21st-century Brazilian actresses